First Baptist Church of Moffat (also known as Moffat Community Church) is a historic church at 401 Lincoln Avenue in Moffat, Colorado.

It was built in 1911 and was added to the National Register in 2008.

It is a T-shaped, cross-gabled building on a concrete foundation, built with ornamental concrete block walls.  It has a corner steeple and two secondary steeples.  Its gables, spires, and roofs are covered with fishscale-patterned stamped metal panels.

References

Baptist churches in Colorado
Churches on the National Register of Historic Places in Colorado
Churches completed in 1911
Saguache County, Colorado
National Register of Historic Places in Saguache County, Colorado
Ornamental block buildings